Accinctapubes chionopheralis is a species of snout moth in the genus Accinctapubes. It was described by George Hampson, in 1906. It is found from Costa Rica to Brazil, Bolivia, Colombia, Ecuador, Venezuela, French Guiana, Guyana, Paraguay and Peru.

The length of the forewings is 12–14 mm for males and 13–15 mm for females.

References

Moths described in 1906
Epipaschiinae
Moths of Central America
Moths of South America